|}

The Sandown Classic Trial is a Group 3 flat horse race in Great Britain open to three-year-old horses. It is run over a distance of 1 mile, 1 furlong and 209 yards at Sandown Park in late April.

History
The event was established in 1953, and it was originally called the Royal Stakes. The first running was won by Mountain King.

Ladbrokes became the sponsor of the race in 1971, and from this point it was known as the Ladbroke Classic Trial. It took place at Kempton Park in 1973.

Subsequent sponsors have included The Guardian, Thresher and Betfred. The online gambling company Bet365 took over the sponsorship in 2008.

The Sandown Classic Trial is staged during a two-day meeting which features both flat and jump races. Other events at the meeting include the Bet365 Gold Cup, the Celebration Chase, the Gordon Richards Stakes and the Sandown Mile.

The race can serve as a trial for the Epsom Derby. The most recent participant to win the Derby is Adayar, the 2021 runner-up.

Records

Leading jockey (5 wins):
 Lester Piggott – Sun Charger (1957), Snow Cat (1958), Ferneley (1962), Sun Rock (1967), Artaius (1977)

Leading trainer (9 wins):
 John Gosden – Pollen Count (1992), True Hero (1993), Linney Head (1994), Santillana (1996), Centennial (2008), Azmeel (2010), Western Hymn (2014), Cunco (2017), Sevenna Star (2018)

Winners since 1974

 .

Earlier winners

 1953: Mountain King
 1954: Taw Valley
 1955: Peter Aegus
 1956: Pearl Orama
 1957: Sun Charger
 1958: Snow Cat
 1959: Casque
 1960: Marengo
 1961: Just Great
 1962: Ferneley
 1963: Raise You Ten
 1964: Oncidium
 1965: Nearside
 1966: Mehari
 1967: Sun Rock
 1968: Safety Match
 1969: Shoemaker
 1970: Cry Baby
 1971: L'Apache
 1972: Pentland Firth
 1973: Ksar

See also
 Horse racing in Great Britain
 List of British flat horse races
 Recurring sporting events established in 1953 – this race is included under its original title, Royal Stakes.

References

 Paris-Turf:
 Racing Post:

 galopp-sieger.de – Sandown Classic Trial (ex Royal Stakes).
 ifhaonline.org – International Federation of Horseracing Authorities – Bet365 Classic Trial (2019).
 pedigreequery.com – Sandown Classic Trial – Sandown.
 

Flat horse races for three-year-olds
Sandown Park Racecourse
Flat races in Great Britain